Kyrock was a small town in Edmonson County in south central Kentucky. It was once a referred to as a “company town” along the Nolin River during much of the first half of the 20th century, but the industrial town no longer exists. It was disincorporated in 1957 after the closure of the company that operated it.

Kyrock was one of several other central Edmonson County communities located near Mammoth Cave National Park.

History

Kentucky Rock Asphalt Company
In 1918, the town was incorporated into a town that was built by the Kentucky Rock Asphalt Company, which the town's name, Kyrock, is derived from. During the company's heyday in the 1920s as Edmonson County's largest local business, the company mined, processed, and shipped hundreds of tons of rock asphalt, by way of both the Nolin and Green Rivers. This was done to eventually pave roadways in areas where they were not previously served by minor or major roadways at the time. The company itself began operations in 1917 after a merger between two companies involved in rock mining and paving. Eight new quarries and a processing facility, which ended up becoming a vital part of the county's history, opened at the site that would become part of the town, which was incorporated in 1918. The material generated by the company, made of silica sand, was the first material ever laid for the Indianapolis Motor Speedway. The asphalt rock from Kyrock was also used to pave the streets of some of the world's major cities such as Rio de Janeiro, Brazil, and Havana, Cuba.

The company stayed open for a total of forty years with its heavy promotions and advertising in many newspapers and trade publications, becoming the state's most successful asphalt mine during that period. Higher costs to pave with asphalt resulted in the end of the company with the advent of petroleum-based asphalt, which was a lower-cost method of paving. The Kentucky Rock Asphalt Company was shut down in 1957. The town itself was unincorporated at some point before 1959. Aside from the original water tower, the only remnants of the town in the present day is a concrete foundation for a swinging footbridge over Pigeon Creek.

Post office
Kyrock's post office operated from 1920 to 1955.

Education

Kyrock High School, which was established sometime in the 1920s, was at one point the largest school in the county. Kyrock High School joined the county's other rural high schools to merge with Brownsville High School in 1959 to form the Edmonson County High School in Brownsville. Kyrock Elementary School is the sole educational institution in the area, housing elementary students from all of the northern half of the county since the 1959-60 school year. The school housed grades 1-8 until 1981, when the Edmonson County Middle School opened. Kyrock continued to house kindergarten through fifth grade, but then dropping fifth grade in 2004 with the opening of the Edmonson County Fifth/Sixth Grade Center. This was done in order to reinstate preschool classes in the county's two elementary schools.

Transportation
In addition to the Nolin River, Kyrock was also served with a ferry that connected the town to Whistle Mountain, and eventually to areas along what is now State Highway 728 into the northeastern portion of the county. Ferry service was discontinued a few years before the U.S. Army Corps of Engineers impounded Nolin River to build Nolin Dam in 1963. State Highway 65 (KY 65; now signed as State Highway 259), which connected Kyrock to other communities and areas of the county, including Brownsville.

Today, Kyrock is nothing more than an rural, unincorporated community along a county-maintained road off KY 259 near Sweeden. Kyrock Road runs from KY 259 in Sweeden to KY 728 just west of Nolin Lake.

References

External links
Historic Mammoth Cave on Facebook - a social media-based effort to preserve photo history of the entire Cave Country region of south-central Kentucky
Kyrock Elementary School (Archived April 7, 2010 
Homage to Kyrock
Kyrock-KY on Facebook

Ghost towns in Kentucky
Geography of Edmonson County, Kentucky
1918 establishments in Kentucky
1957 disestablishments in Kentucky